Johann van der Westhuizen (born 26 May 1952 in Windhoek, South West Africa (now Namibia) is a former judge of the Constitutional Court of South Africa. Before his judicial appointment, he was a professor at the University of Pretoria Faculty of Law and the founding director of its Centre for Human Rights.

Early life 

Van der Westhuizen was born in Windhoek, South West Africa (now Namibia). He went to school there and in Pretoria. He received a BA in 1973, an LLB in 1975 (receiving the Grotius medal as the best final-year law student), and an LLD in 1980, all from the University of Pretoria.

Legal career 

Van der Westhuizen was professor (from 1980 to 1998) and head (from 1980 to 1994) of the Department of Legal History, Comparative Law and Legal Philosophy in the University of Pretoria's Faculty of Law. He was the founding director of the university's Centre for Human Rights from 1986 to 1998. The Centre played a prominent role in legal resistance to apartheid and in the debate about a new constitutional dispensation and is now internationally recognised as a leading human rights institution in Africa.

He was admitted as an advocate of the High Court of South Africa (in 1976) and was an associate member of the Pretoria Bar (1989-1998). Justice Van der Westhuizen acted as counsel in human-rights litigation and argued many appeals against the censorship of socially and politically significant films and books such as 'Roots', 'Cry Freedom' and 'A Dry White Season'. He acted as a consultant and in-house advocate for the Legal Resources Centre and Lawyers for Human Rights and served on the national council and board of trustees of Lawyers for Human Rights.

He was intimately involved in the drafting of South Africa's Constitution in 1995 and 1996 as a member of the Independent Panel of Recognised Constitutional Experts, which advised the Constitutional Assembly, and of the Technical Refinement Team, responsible for the final drafting and editing process. At the multiparty negotiating process in 1993, resulting in the adoption of the interim Constitution, and at the Transitional Executive Council in 1994, he served as the convenor of task groups dealing with the abolition of discriminatory and oppressive legislation from the apartheid era. He also co-ordinated the equality legislation drafting project of the Ministry of Justice and the South African Human Rights Commission in 19.

He currently serves as Jurisprudence Head of Department, Faculty of Law University of Pretoria.

Judicial career 

In 1999 he was appointed by President Nelson Mandela as a judge in the Transvaal Provincial Division of the High Court of South Africa (now the North Gauteng High Court) in Pretoria.

He joined the Constitutional Court of South Africa on 1 February 2004. Constitutional Court judgments written by Justice Van der Westhuizen dealt with matters including constitutional amendments, provincial boundaries and powers, fair trial issues, equality, the development of African customary law, asset forfeiture and search and seizure procedures and the right to privacy. He retired on 29 January 2016.

Honours and awards

Van der Westhuizen was awarded an Alexander von Humboldt Fellowship and the Southern Africa Research Program fellowship to Yale University. He is a council member of the South African Judicial Education Institute, an extraordinary professor at the University of Pretoria and a member of the board of trustees of its Centre for Human Rights.

References

Living people
Namibian emigrants to South Africa
People from Windhoek
White South African people
University of Pretoria alumni
Academic staff of the University of Pretoria
Judges of the Constitutional Court of South Africa
South African judges
1952 births